Frolovskaya is a rural locality (a village) in Krasnoborsky District, Arkhangelsk Oblast, Russia. The population was 441 as of 2010. There are 7 streets.

Geography 
Frolovskaya is located 4 km northwest of Krasnoborsk (the district's administrative centre) by road. Kalinka-Gridinskaya is the nearest rural locality.

References 

Rural localities in Krasnoborsky District